The 1982 Ohio State Buckeyes football team represented the Ohio State University in the 1982 Big Ten Conference football season. The Buckeyes compiled a 9–3 record, including the 1982 Holiday Bowl in San Diego, California, where they won, 47–17 against the BYU Cougars.

For the second season in a row, Ohio State did not play Iowa, and that potentially cost the Buckeyes a trip to the 1983 Rose Bowl and conference title, the second year in a row that Ohio State could have been a Rose Bowl participant. Had the Buckeyes beaten Iowa, Ohio State would have been the Rose Bowl representative after beating Michigan head to head.

Schedule

Personnel

Season summary

Baylor

Michigan State

Stanford

Florida State

Wisconsin

Illinois

Indiana

Purdue

Minnesota

Northwestern

Michigan

Holiday Bowl

Depth chart

1983 NFL draftees

References

Ohio State
Ohio State Buckeyes football seasons
Holiday Bowl champion seasons
Ohio State Buckeyes football